Honor Among Thieves is Edwin McCain's first major-label album, released on CD and cassette tape on August 15, 1995 by Lava Records.

Songs from Thieves also appear on McCain's live concert DVD, Tinsel & Tap Shoes.

Track listing
All songs written by Edwin McCain.

 "Alive" - 4:03
 "Solitude" - 4:32
 "Jesters, Dreamers & Thieves" - 4:23
 "Guinevere" - 3:31
 "Sorry to a Friend" - 3:56
 "America Street" - 4:41
 "Russian Roulette" - 4:59
 "Bitter Chill" - 4:23
 "Don't Bring Me Down" - 4:00
 "Kitchen Song" - 4:22
 "Thirty Pieces" - 4:32
 "3 AM" - 4:24

Personnel
Greg Adams - trumpet, flugelhorn
Scott Bannevich - bass
Mark Bryan - electric guitar
Alice Echols - background vocals
Chuck Findley - trumpet, flugelhorn
Paul Fox - piano, Hammond organ, producer
Lili Haydn - violin
Rami Jaffee - Hammond organ
Nick Lane - trombone
Edwin McCain - guitar, Hammond organ, vocals, background vocals
Darius Rucker - vocals
Craig Shields - keyboards, tenor, baritone and soprano saxophone
TJ Hall - drums and percussion
Kevin Smith - percussion
Rose Stone - background vocals
Gerri Sutyak - cello
Ed Thacker - engineer
George Marino - mastering engineer

Charts
Album

Singles

Notes 

 

1995 debut albums
Lava Records albums
Edwin McCain albums
Albums produced by Paul Fox (record producer)